Live at the Winter Garden is Liza Minnelli's second solo live album and the first under her Columbia contract. The album was released for the first time in 1974.  It was released on CD in April 2012, the release contain three "live" bonus tracks that did not appear on the album: "You and I","It Had to Be You" and "My Shining Hour".

Track listing

Personnel
 Produced by: Gary Klein
 Arranged by: Ralph Burns, Billy Eyers, Jack French, Jonathan Tunick, Billy Reddy, Peter Matz & Fred Werner
 Remote Engineer: Phil Ramone
 Remix & Editing Engineer: Don Puluse
 Location engineers: Aaron Baron, Larry Dahlstrom
 Recordists: Hank Altman, Tom Dwyer
 Cover illustration: Joe Eula
 Back cover photos: Arthur Maillot, Robert Deutsch
 Back cover design: Karen Lee Grant

Musicians
 Rhythm: Arthur Azenzer, Frank Bruno, Norman Jeffries, Don De Marco, Jack Cavari
 Brass: Al Di Risi, John Frosk, Lew Gluckin, Ronald Keller, Vincent Fanuele, Wayne Andre, Fred Zito
 Woodwinds: Al Ragni, Dennis Anderson, Lewis Del Gatto, Walter Kane
 Strings: Max Cahn, Tobias Bloom, Joseph Goodman, Marie Hence, Elmar Ollveira, Ian Wint, Sandra Robbins, Nina Simon, Maurice Brown, Bernard Fennell
 Percussion: Eric Cohen, Charles Roeder
 Orchestra personnel manager: Earl Shendell

Charts

References

Original LP jacket
The Liza Minnelli Scrapbook, Citadel Press 2004, by Scott Schechter

Liza Minnelli live albums
1974 live albums
Albums arranged by Peter Matz
Albums arranged by Ralph Burns
albums produced by Gary Klein (producer)
Columbia Records live albums